Library War could refer to:
 Library War, a Japanese light novel series
 Library War (TV series), a 2008 Japanese animated television series based on the light novel series
 Library War: The Wings of Revolution, a 2012 Japanese animated film based on the light novel series
 Library Wars (film), a 2013 Japanese film based on the light novel series
 Library Wars: The Last Mission, a 2015 Japanese film sequel